Samuel Chu Muk Man  (born 3 January 1978) is a Hong Kong-born American activist and community organizer. Chu is the founder and President of The Campaign for Hong Kong, a US-based nonpartisan organization whose mission is to advocate for American leadership and policies that advance human rights and democracy in Hong Kong. Chu is also the founder of the Hong Kong Democracy Council (HKDC), launched in 2019, and was its managing director until August 2021. The success of HKDC and Chu in pushing for the Hong Kong Human Rights and Democracy Act and the Hong Kong Autonomy Act, and for economic sanctions and visa bans by the US on Chinese and Hong Kong officials it deemed responsible for the erosion of Hong Kong's basic freedoms and autonomy, led Hong Kong authorities to issue arrest warrants against Chu in July 2020, making him the first foreign citizen to be targeted under the Hong Kong National Security Law.

From 2011 to 2021, Chu served as the national organizer for MAZON: A Jewish Response to Hunger, leading local and regional campaigns around issues of food insecurity and access in various states.  He was a fellow at the Center for Religion and Civic Culture at University of Southern California, where he engages in research, writing and teaching around community organizing, public leadership, and the role of religious institutions in social change.

He served as chair and president of the board of directors of One LA-Industrial Areas Foundation, one of the nation's largest community organizing networks and of 1010 Development Corporation, a non-profit affordable housing developer in Los Angeles rooted in the United Methodist tradition.

He also directed special projects for Consumer Watchdog as well as the social justice program, Minyan Tzedek, at IKAR, a Jewish spiritual community that stands at the intersection of spirituality and social justice in Los Angeles, CA, led by Rabbi Sharon Brous.

Early life
Chu was born on 3 January 1978 in Hong Kong. He grew up in a Southern Baptist household. Chu graduated from the University of California, San Diego in 2000, majoring in political science. He completed his studies at Fuller Theological Seminary in 2002.

Career
He pastored at Immanuel Presbyterian Church (Presbyterian Church USA) in Los Angeles, CA from 2002 to 2009., a multi-cultural, social justice congregation on Wilshire Boulevard.

He also served on the board of directors of various other organizations such as the California Council of Churches.

Chu was the Executive Director of California Faith for Equality and California Faith for Equality Action Fund from January 2009 to March 2011. Chu was appointed as interim executive director in January 2009 and later appointed as CFE's first permanent executive director in April 2010 after an extensive national search. He was the first straight person to head a statewide lesbian, gay, bisexual, and transgender supportive organization. Under his leadership, CFE filed one of the largest amicus briefs to the courts in support of marriage equality.

In 2011, Chu was recognized by the City of Los Angeles with the LGBT Pride Award for his leadership in promoting and organizing religious support for LGBT civil rights and marriage equality.

In 2008, Chu joined the effort, as a national director, to develop the national, bi-coastal network of youth development projects called WorkUp, focusing primarily on asset building, financial literacy, and social entrepreneurship.

He has organized for OneLA where his accomplishments included creating and implementing projects such as the largest community-led enrollment program for the Affordable Care Act in California and the nation's first mortgage principle reduction plan during the foreclosure crisis

In his role as National Organizer for MAZON: A Jewish Response to Hunger, Chu oversees engagement of over 950 synagogue partners across the country and directs a growing political constituency that has won legislative and administrative changes at the state and regional levels – including $8 million in new state funding to provide free school lunch to 62,000 additional low-income students in Minnesota, universal breakfast for over 4,000,000 students across 1,000 public school campuses in Texas, and improved access to Supplemental Nutrition Assistance Program (formerly known as "food stamps") for thousands of families, veterans and homeless minors in Pennsylvania and California.

Chu launched and led the nation's first state legislative effort to expose and address "lunch shaming" in Minnesota.  "Lunch shaming" is the practice by school staff and workers of denying students healthy, nutritious meals because of the inability to pay or accrued debts.  When a student is unable to pay for a school meal, he or she might be given an alternative meal (like half a cheese sandwich), some are turned away, others have their food taken away and dumped.  The "shaming" extends to practices such as "hand-stamping" – whereas a student's hand is stamped with the word "money" – or other forms of debt collection activities against the students and families. The campaign led to the expansion of free school meals to 62,000 additional low-income students in Minnesota and led to the first statewide ban on all shaming practices by schools.

From 2016 to 2017, Chu served as the Director of the Civic Engagement Program for Murmuration – a 16-school pilot program in Los Angeles County designed to increase voter engagement and parent leadership by combining community organizing, voting data, and civic tech. The program resulted in a voting bloc of over 6,000 voters across partnering schools, registered over 2,000 new voters within the 16 school communities, and boosted voter turnout among pilot schools to consistently outpace the state, county, city, and district turnout over five consecutive elections. In his role with Murmuration Chu also organized one of the largest parent-led public actions in May 2017 to protect immigrant families with 300 parent leaders, California Senate President pro Tempore Kevin de León, Los Angeles City Attorney Mike Feuer, Los Angeles County Sheriff's Department, and Los Angeles Police Department.

Chu is a frequent speaker and presenter at conferences, programs, and other training institutes, including #RealCollege, Planned Parenthood's Power of Pink, Advancing Justice Conference, the American Muslim Civic Leadership Institute, and the United States Student Association.

Chu was the managing director of the Hong Kong Democracy Council until August 2021, when he stepped down together with fellow core members Victoria Hui and Annie Boyajian. Chu and Boyajian did not give reasons for their resignations; Hui hinted at difficulties within the board after efforts to recruit new leaders had failed.

Personal life
Chu resides in Los Angeles, California while also spending significant time in Washington, DC. Chu is the son of Rev. Chu Yiu-ming, a retired minister who co-founded Occupy Central with Love and Peace and one of the leaders of the Umbrella Movement in Hong Kong. In July 2020, police in Hong Kong announced that they were seeking the arrest of six pro-democracy activists. Chu was one listed, despite being an American citizen.

See also 
 Hong Kong Human Rights and Democracy Act
 Hong Kong Autonomy Act
 Magnitsky Act
 United States sanctions against China
 Chu Yiu-ming
 Democratic development in Hong Kong
 Hong Kong national security law

References

University of California, San Diego alumni
Hong Kong emigrants to the United States
Living people
Fuller Theological Seminary alumni
University of Southern California fellows
1978 births
Fugitives wanted under the Hong Kong national security law